The Big Ten Conference Player of the Year is a college softball award given to the Big Ten Conference's most outstanding player. The award was first given following the 1985 season, with both pitchers and position players eligible. After the 1992 season, the Big Ten Conference Softball Pitcher of the Year award was created to honor the most outstanding pitcher.

Key

Winners

Winners by school

References

Awards established in 1985
Player
NCAA Division I softball conference players of the year